The European Association of Communications Agencies (EACA) is a European trade association founded in 1959. Based in Brussels, Belgium, it brings together more than 2500 communications agencies and agency associations from nearly 30 European countries. EACA members include advertising, media, digital, branding and PR agencies.

EACA represents its members and defends their interests in the decision-making processes of the Institutions of the European Union. Privacy and data protection, gender portrayal, disinformation, digital taxation and regulation of online platforms are some of the issues that it addresses. The association is also home to “Inspire”, a single European hub with education and training opportunities for all stakeholders in the communications industry, and it runs two advertising awards annually.

EACA is financed by its members and is a member of the European Advertising Standards Alliance, which is the single authoritative voice on advertising self-regulation issues in Europe and the founding member of the European Interactive Digital Advertising Alliance which provides the AdChoices icon to companies involved in data-driven advertising across Europe.

History 
EACA was founded in 1959 in Oslo by a group of full-service agencies from the Nordic countries, France, Britain and the Federal Republic of Germany. In the second half of the 1970s it moved its activity to Brussels to be closer to European policy-makers.

Activities 
 Promoting and protecting the interests of Europe's communications agencies through lobbying activities
 Providing information to agencies, members, policy stakeholders and anyone interested in the industry
Partnering with other industry bodies to tackle some of the key industry issues which influence agency business at a large scale
 Providing education and training opportunities for all stakeholders in the communications industry
 Running two advertising awards annually: the Effie Awards Europe for effectiveness and the IMC European Awards for brand activation

Membership structure 
The membership structure is divided into five councils:
 The International Agencies' Council (IAC) - the largest international agencies in Europe
 The National Associations' Council (NAC) - the national agency associations in 29 European markets
 The Media Agencies' Council (MAC) - international media networks
 The Integrated Marketing Communications' Council (IMCC) - national associations of leading sales promotion agencies in Europe
 The Health Communications' Council (HCC) - the key players in European health communications

References 

Public relations